Panorpa rufa, the red scorpionfly, is a species of scorpionfly in the family Panorpidae.  It is found in the southeastern United States from southern North Carolina south to northern Florida, and westward to eastern Mississippi.

References

Panorpidae
Articles created by Qbugbot
Insects described in 1832